Arismendi Blanco is a municipality of Sucre, Venezuela. The capital is Río Caribe.

Municipalities of Sucre (state)